The Fjøløy Lighthouse is a coastal lighthouse in the municipality of Rennesøy in Rogaland county, Norway. The lighthouse sits on the island of Fjøløy, along the Boknafjorden.  It is owned by the Norwegian Coastal Administration. The lighthouse was first built in 1849, but it has been replaced twice since that time.

History
The lighthouse was established on the island Fjøløy in the old municipality of Mosterøy in 1849.  It originally was a relatively small lighthouse that was only active during the season of the herring fisheries. In 1867, the original light was replaced by larger wooden lighthouse. During the occupation of Norway by Nazi Germany the occupants constructed fortifications at the site.  That lighthouse was automated in 1977. In 1983, the old, wooden lighthouse was closed down and replaced by a smaller, automated lighthouse on the same site.

Design
It emits a white, red, or green light (depending on direction) that is occulting in groups of two, every eight seconds. The light burns at a 31,300-candela intensity. The lighthouse tower is painted white and the roof is red.

See also

 List of lighthouses in Norway
 Lighthouses in Norway

References

External links
 
 Norsk Fyrhistorisk Forening 

Lighthouses completed in 1849
Lighthouses in Rogaland
1849 establishments in Norway
Rennesøy